Panth-Piploda was a province of British India. It is located in present-day Ratlam district of Madhya Pradesh state of central India. 

It was located in the Malwa region, and consisted of several separate enclaves, bounded by the princely states of Gwalior, Jaora, and Dewas. The province was governed by a chief commissioner appointed by the Governor-General of India.

History
In 1935 Panth Piploda was separated from Bombay. Panth-Piploda was a small tract of territory comprising only 10½ villages, which were held by five different thakurs. In  1765, the Peshwa of the Maratha Empire assigned the revenues from the villages to the family of Sambhaji Attaji, a Deshastha Brahmin. This ruling family was later known as the family of the Khandekar Pandits. The arrangement made by the Peshwa was respected by the British when they took over Panth Piploda from the Marathas in 1817. The ruling family did not have any proprietary rights whatever in these villages and were mere tankadars (recipients of the cash allowance). This cash allowance was paid to them by the Political Agent in Malwa Agency who realized it from the thakurs in whose territories the villages lay. The estate was managed by a Superintendent under the control of the Political Agent with headquarters at Kharua (also spelled as Kharwa). In 1936, there were two guaranteed tankadars, who received payments totaling Rs. 46,000. It became a province of British India in 1942. On 15 Aug 1947 it became part of independent India.

Chief Commissioners
1935–1940 Kenneth Samuel Fitze (1887–1960)
1940–1942 Gerald Thomas Fisher (1887–1965)
1942–1946 Walter Fendall Campbell  KCIE (1894–1973)
1946–1947 Henry Mortimer Poulton (1898–1973)

Notes

Provinces of British India
Malwa
Ratlam
History of Madhya Pradesh
Ujjain district